Kerken with the towns of Aldekerk, Eyll, Nieukerk and Stenden, is a municipality in the district of Kleve in the state of North Rhine-Westphalia, Germany. It is located near the border with the Netherlands, approx. 15 km north-east of Venlo.

Personalities

Sons and daughters of the city 

 Johannes Ackermanns (1887-1962), municipal politician
 Franz Grobben (1904-1994), CDU politician
 Guido Winkmann (* 1973), football league judge

Personalities who have worked on the ground 
 Fritz Lewerentz, (1878-1945), SPD politician and victim of the Nazi dictatorship

References

Kleve (district)